Paalam is a 1990 Indian Tamil-language vigilante film directed by Karvannan. The film stars Murali, M. N. Nambiar, Kitty and newcomer Vasudevan Baskaran, with Senthil, Anuja, Suryakanth, Balambika, Kannan, Ramesh and Gowri in supporting roles. It was released on 10 March 1990.

Plot 

In the past, Jeeva was a college student studying in the city. His family lived in his native village, he has a brother Muthu, a sister-in-law Vadivukkarasi and a blind sister Selvi. Muthu and the villagers were tired of getting a small amount for their manual labour, so they went on strike. The wealthy landlord Arivumathi reluctantly accepted for their claim, he felt that the villagers didn't respect him anymore. So Arivumathi sent henchmen to kill Muthu, in the meantime, Arivumathi raped his wife Vadivukkarasi and he kidnapped the blind Selvi. His henchmen set fires on the thatched houses of the poor villagers. Using his power, Arivumathi made Muthu and Vadivukkarasi arrested by the police and were sent to jail. Jeeva later came to save his sister Selvi.

Now, one year later, Arivumathi becomes a corrupt minister. Jeeva sends his sister Selvi to a college for the blind. Jeeva and his college friends find themselves unemployed after college. One day, they tease Arivumathi while he attends a college function and the police arrest two of Jeeva's friends. They strongly believe that the corrupt politicians are the reason behind their unemployment. Jeeva and his friends thus plan to kidnap the corrupt minister Arivumathi. Arivumathi often travels in his car the night and always takes the Paramankeni bridge. So Jeeva put dynamites under that bridge, Jeeva and his friends acquire heavy weapons.

One night, they stop the minister's car on the bridge, they drive out the driver and the minister's secretary. They keep Arivumathi as a hostage. The news reaches the police, assistant commissioner of police Rajan Sharma with his brigade come to the spot of kidnapping. Rajan Sharma asks them to release the minister but Jeeva refuses. Jeeva first wants the police to free his brother, his sister-in-law and two of his friends who are in jail for the crime they didn't commit. Then superintendent of police Izhavenil comes to help the police team. Izhavenil and Rajan Sharma are pressured by IG Ramaraj, their superior does not want to release the innocent captives. The police try to save the minister in many ways but fail every time. What transpires later forms the crux of the story.

Cast 

Murali as Jeeva
M. N. Nambiar as SP Izhavenil
Kitty as ACP Rajan Sharma
Vasudevan Baskaran as Arivumathi
Senthil
Anuja as an item number
Suryakanth as Muthu
Balambika as Selvi
Kannan as Sridhar
Ramesh as IG Ramaraj
Gowri as Vadivukkarasi
Sree Bala
Sulakshana as Sulakshana
Bhanu Sree
S. Ramadoss as himself
Iniyan Sampath as himself
Cho Ramaswamy as himself

Soundtrack 
The soundtrack was composed by N. S. T. Rajesh, with lyrics written by Rajan Sarma.

Reception 
P. S. S. of Kalki called it a different kind of film, modern art.

References

External links 
 

1990 directorial debut films
1990 films
1990s Tamil-language films
1990s vigilante films
Films about kidnapping in India
Indian rape and revenge films
Indian vigilante films